The Women's Volleyball Thailand League is the highest level of Thailand club volleyball in the 2013–14 season and the 9th edition.

Teams

 Ayutthaya A.T.C.C
 Idea Khonkaen
 Nakhonnont
 Nakhon Ratchasima
 Sisaket
 Suan Sunandha
 Supreme Chonburi
 Udonthani

Regular season

Ranking

|}

Round 1 

|}

Round 2 

|}

Final standing

Awards

2013
Thailand League 
Volleyball,Thailand League 
Thailand League 
Volleyball,Thailand League